Lucien Baker (June 8, 1846June 21, 1907)  was a United States senator from Kansas.

Baker was born near Cleveland, Ohio and moved with his parents to Morenci, Michigan. There he attended the public schools and graduated from Adrian College and from the law department of the University of Michigan at Ann Arbor.

He was admitted to the bar in 1868 and commenced practice in Leavenworth, Kansas in 1869. From 1872 to 1874, he was a city attorney of Leavenworth.

From 1893 to 1895, he was a member of the State Senate and was elected as a Republican to the United States Senate. He served from March 4, 1895 to March 3, 1901 but was an unsuccessful candidate for renomination. He was the chairman of the Committee on Civil Service and Retrenchment (Fifty-sixth Congress)

Afterward his term in the Senate, he resumed the practice of law in Leavenworth, where he died on June 21, 1907; he is interred in Mount Muncie Cemetery.

He was the brother of John Baker.

Sources 

1846 births
1907 deaths
Politicians from Cleveland
Politicians from Leavenworth, Kansas
Republican Party Kansas state senators
Republican Party United States senators from Kansas
Kansas Republicans
Adrian College alumni
University of Michigan Law School alumni
People from Lenawee County, Michigan
19th-century American politicians